Pyeongchang-eup (평창읍) is a town in South Korea and the county seat of the county of Pyeongchang. It is located on the left bank of the river Pyeongchanggang.

Economy
Its local activities include the production of tobacco, silk, and honey. It is also a tourist resort due to its location in an area popular with mountaineering and skiing activities.

Sport
The county of Pyeongchang is the host city of the 2018 Winter Olympics and Paralympics. However, none of the events were held in the actual city of Pyeongchang-eup.

References

External links
 Official website

Pyeongchang County
Towns and townships in Gangwon Province, South Korea